Baselios Marthoma Mathews II (30 January 1915 – 26 January 2006) was the primate of the Malankara Orthodox Syrian Church. He was the 6th Catholicos of Malankara Orthodox Syrian Church and 19th Malankara Metropolitan.

Early life 
He was born at Perinad in Kollam district of Kerala, and had his theological education at Old Seminary Kottayam and also at Basil Dayara, Pathanamthitta. Later he joined Bishop’s College, Calcutta for his B. D. Degree, and studied Theology at the General Theological Seminary, New York.

Priesthood 
He was ordained as deacon in 1938 then as priest in 1941. Baselios Geevarghese II took special interest in the activities of Father Mathews. As a monk, Fr. Mathews stayed at St. George Dayara, Othara and led a prayerful life. The faithful members of the Church were attracted by the purity of life and refulgent smile of Fr. Mathews, and affectionately referred to him as "Angel Achen" (Malayalam: എയ്ഞ്ചെൽ അച്ചൻ, meaning 'angelic priest').

On 15 May 1953 he was ordained as bishop Mathews Mar Coorilose at the age of 38 by the Catholicos Baselios Geevarghese II. Mar Coorilose was appointed by the Catholicose to assist Metropolitan Alexios Mar Theodosius of Kollam Diocese. While he was Metropolitan of the Diocese of Kollam the number of parishes almost doubled within a short period. Several monasteries and convents were established. A large number of educational institutions and hospitals were also established. In addition. several Colleges, Schools, Hospitals and other service institutions were established and administered under his direct control and leadership. He traveled in various countries including the United States, Canada, Europe, Malaya, Singapore and Gulf countries, and attended various international meetings and conferences.

Primate 
In 1980 he was unanimously elected by the Malankara Syrian Christian Association (the general assembly of representatives of the Church's parishes) as the successor-designate to the Catholicos of the East and Malankara Metropolitan.

A Civil Service Academy was started at Thiruvananthapuram, to give proper training for candidates appearing for I. A. S.; I. P. S.; I. F. S. and other Central Service Examinations. With a view to provide shelter for the poor, a House Building Assistance project was started. When Catholicos Baselios Marthoma Mathews I abdicated the throne due to ill health, Mar Coorilose was elevated to the throne of St Thomas as Baselious Marthoma Mathews II, Catholicos of the East and Malankara Metropolitan on 29 April 1991, becoming the Sixth Catholicos in Malankara and 89th Successor to the Holy Apostolic Throne of St Thomas.

He served as the President of the Ecumenical committee in Kerala and also on various other Inter-Church Committees. 
Mathews II as the head of the Episcopal Synod of Malankara Orthodox Church canonized Mar Dionysius VI on the 69th feast day of the saint (24 February 2003). St. Dionysius is the second Indian Saint to be canonized by the Malankara Orthodox Syrian Church.

Retirement and Death 
Due to ill health from old age Mathews II resigned his position as the Supreme Head of the Indian Orthodox Church on 29 October 2005. He died three months later on 26 January 2006, and was interred at Mount Horeb Chapel, in Sasthamkotta on the 28th.

See also
 Indian (Malankara) Orthodox Church

Catholicoi of the East and Malankara Metropolitans
Malankara Orthodox Syrian Church bishops
20th-century Oriental Orthodox bishops
1915 births
2006 deaths